Dan Suter (born 29 June 1993) is a Welsh rugby union player who plays for the Dragons regional team as a prop. He was also a Wales under-20 international.

Suter made his debut for the Ospreys regional team in 2012 having previously played for the Ospreys academy, Bridgend Ravens, Aberavon RFC, Swansea RFC and Tonmawr RFC. He was released by the Ospreys at the end of the 2016–17 season.

Suter joined the Dragons for the 2017–18 season.

References

External links 
Dragons profile

Rugby union players from Neath
Welsh rugby union players
Ospreys (rugby union) players
Dragons RFC players
Living people
1993 births
Bridgend RFC players
Aberavon RFC players
Swansea RFC players
Rugby union props